Brick Mansions is a 2014 action film starring Paul Walker, David Belle, RZA, also starring Goûchy Boy, Catalina Denis and Carlo Rota. The film was directed by Camille Delamarre and written by Luc Besson, Robert Mark Kamen and Bibi Naceri. It is a remake of the 2004 French film District 13, in which Belle had also starred.

Brick Mansions was released on April 25, 2014, five months after Walker's death on November 30, 2013 and has a dedication to him at the start of the credits. This was Walker's penultimate film, followed by his final film appearance in Furious 7.

Plot
In 2018, in a crime-ridden dystopian Detroit, a particularly notorious neighborhood has grown so dangerous that law enforcement is overwhelmed. Unable to control the crime, city officials build a colossal, -tall containment wall around this area, known as Brick Mansions, "the projects", or the "no-go zone", to cut it off from the rest of the city. Police monitor all movement in and out of Brick Mansions, and schools and hospitals within it have been shut down. For undercover cop Damien Collier (Paul Walker), every day is a battle against corruption after the death of his father. For French-Caribbean ex-convict Lino Duppre (David Belle), every day is a fight to live an honest life.

Lino is hunted by drug kingpin Tremaine Alexander for stealing a massive amount of heroin and emptying it down a bathtub. Lino evades capture, and so Tremaine has his men capture Lino's girlfriend, Lola. Lino attempts to free her, and together they manage to escape and capture Tremaine in the Projects, turning him in to police at the border wall. However, Lino is shocked when the police free Tremaine and arrest him instead; it turns out that the police have long been in Tremaine's pay. While arrested, Lino kills a police officer in a failed attempt to escape.

In the meantime, city officials have discovered that Tremaine has gained hold of a nuclear explosive and a small missile, which he plans to launch into downtown Detroit unless he obtains a ransom. Damien is sent undercover as a prisoner in order to free Lino so that the two can destroy the bomb together. Together, the two manage to escape from a police van. In the beginning they fight each other, both verbally and physically, but they eventually decide to work together - though not before Lino deduces that Damien is actually an undercover cop. Together, the two face off against Tremaine and his gang in order to free Lola and defuse the bomb.

As they are set to defuse the missile, Damien discovers that Tremaine was bluffing and never planned to actually launch it - and that Damien was sent not to defuse the missile but to unknowingly launch it, not into downtown Detroit but into Brick Mansions itself, in order to kill its inhabitants and clear the entire area for upscale development. Damien also finds out from Tremaine that his father was not killed by criminals but by his fellow officers, and that the mayor of Detroit was behind both plots. Damien, Lino, and Tremaine confront the mayor at his office and get him to admit his plan - then reveal that they have been secretly recording his statements. The mayor is then arrested.

Brick Mansions is welcomed back into the city, with Damien and Lino continuing their friendship. Tremaine runs for Mayor of Detroit, promoting the idea of equality and freedom.

Cast
 Paul Walker as Damien Collier
 David Belle as Lino Duppre
 RZA as Tremaine Alexander
 Gouchy Boy as "K2"
 Catalina Denis as Lola 
 Carlo Rota as George "The Greek"
 Kwasi Songui as Cecil "Big Cecil"
 Robert Maillet as "Yeti"
 Ayisha Issa as Rayzah
 Richard Zeman as Reno
 Bruce Ramsay as The Mayor 
 Andreas Apergis as Berringer 
 Ryan Trudeau as Floyd 
 Chimwemwe Miller as The Accountant 
 Carolina Bartczak as Nurse Clara 
 Ron Lea as Lieutenant

Production
Principal photography began on April 30, 2013, in Montreal and the film was released in 2014 by EuropaCorp. Relativity Media distributed the film. Following Walker's death, the North American release was scheduled for February and French release for April 23. On February 6, 2014, Relativity and EuropaCorp announced a move to April 25, 2014, as a release date for the film, along with paying the cost of the film's world premiere and distribution.

Release
The first official trailer was released on February 13, 2014, featuring the DJ Snake and Lil Jon song "Turn Down for What". The second full trailer was released on March 20, 2014.

Reception
On Rotten Tomatoes, the film has an approval rating of 25% based on 95 reviews, with an average rating of 4.43/10. The website's critics consensus reads: "Choppily edited and largely bereft of plot, Brick Mansions wastes a likable cast on a pointless remake of the far more entertaining District B13." On Metacritic, the film has a weighted average score of 40 out of 100, based on 28 critics, indicating "mixed or average reviews". Audiences surveyed by CinemaScore gave the film a grade B+ on scale of A to F.

Critic Jennifer Rodman, considered the film a "watered-down American version, similar in many forms...a huge disappointment". Andrew Pulver wrote in The Guardian, "to be honest, Brick Mansions is not a great film — it kind of skimps on the parkour, the main reason why anyone went to see District 13." Varietys Justin Chang called the film "propulsively entertaining" but was critical of the "aggressive cutting technique" which fails to allow audiences to fully appreciate the stuntwork and movements of the actors. Mick Lasalle of The San Francisco Chronicle wrote, "The movie itself makes that impossible to forget. There are cars all over the movie - car chases, car crashes, crazy driving, a scene of Walker hanging from a speeding car, and even a scene of Walker and another guy going 80 miles an hour when the brakes and the steering give out. Apart from that, there's just the awkwardness of looking at someone on screen and knowing more about him than he knows about himself." Lasalle concluded, "Things start off silly and end up laughable and ridiculous." A. O. Scott of The New York Times wrote, "this movie, a remake of the 2004 French franchise-starter District B13, can be enjoyably crazy in its hectic, cartoonish way" but that it is also "brawny, dumb and preposterous."

See also
 District 13: Ultimatum

References

External links
 
 
 
 

2014 films
2014 action thriller films
French action thriller films
Hood films
Canadian action thriller films
American action thriller films
2010s dystopian films
Films set in 2018
Remakes of French films
American remakes of French films
Parkour in film
Films set in Detroit
Films set in the future
District 13 films
Films shot in Michigan
Films shot in Montreal
EuropaCorp films
Films produced by Luc Besson
Relativity Media films
Films shot in Detroit
English-language Canadian films
English-language French films
2014 directorial debut films
2010s English-language films
2010s American films
2010s Canadian films
2010s French films